István Halász (12 October 1951 – 4 June 2016) was a Hungarian football midfielder who played for Hungary in the 1978 FIFA World Cup. He also played for FC Tatabánya.

References

External links
 

1951 births
2016 deaths
Hungarian footballers
Hungary international footballers
Association football midfielders
FC Tatabánya players
Vasas SC players
Nyíregyháza Spartacus FC players
Dorogi FC footballers
1978 FIFA World Cup players
Nemzeti Bajnokság I players
Sportspeople from Szabolcs-Szatmár-Bereg County